Acacia johnsonii, commonly known as gereera wattle or geereva wattle, is a shrub belonging to the genus Acacia and the subgenus Phyllodineae that is native to parts of eastern Australia.

Description
Like most species of Acacia it has phyllodes rather than true leaves. The flat evergreen patent to erect phyllodes have a linear to narrowly linear shape and are straight to shallowly incurved. It blooms between August and October producing simple inflorescences that occur singly in the upper axils, the spherical flower-heads contain 20 to 30 golden coloured flowers.

Taxonomy
The specific epithet honours the collector of the type specimen, Robert William Johnson, who collected it in 1963 from an area to the north of Chinchilla. Johnson was also once the Director of the Queensland Herbarium.

Distribution
The shrub has a wide distribution through south eastern Queensland and central New South Wales. It is commonly situated on sand-plains growing in sandy soils as a part of spinifex communities.

See also
List of Acacia species

References

johnsonii
Flora of New South Wales
Flora of Queensland
Plants described in 1980
Taxa named by Leslie Pedley